Martyr of His Heart (German: Der Märtyrer seines Herzens) is a 1918 Austrian silent historical film directed by Emil Justitz and starring Fritz Kortner, Marion Illing and Anton Pointner. It is a biopic of the composer Ludwig van Beethoven.

Cast
 Fritz Kortner as Ludwig van Beethoven 
 Marion Illing
 Anton Pointner
 Else Heller
 Nelly Hochwald as Giulietta Guicciardi

References

Bibliography
 Robert Von Dassanowsky. Austrian Cinema: A History. McFarland, 2005.

External links

Austro-Hungarian films
1918 films
Austrian silent feature films
Films directed by Emil Justitz
Austrian black-and-white films
1910s biographical drama films
Austrian historical drama films
Austrian biographical drama films
1910s historical drama films
Depictions of Ludwig van Beethoven on film
1918 drama films
Silent historical drama films
1910s German-language films